Peterhead railway station was a railway station in Peterhead, Aberdeenshire.

History
The railway station was opened on 3 July 1862 by the Formartine and Buchan Railway. To the north was the goods yard, further north was a locomotive shed and to the west was the signal box, which opened in 1883 and replaced in 1890. It was closed to passengers on 3 May 1965 and to freight in 1970. The signal box closed in 1966 and was replaced by a ground frame. The track was subsequently removed. The site is now a school.

References
 

Disused railway stations in Aberdeenshire
Beeching closures in Scotland
Former Great North of Scotland Railway stations
Railway stations in Great Britain opened in 1862
Railway stations in Great Britain closed in 1965
Transport in Peterhead
Buildings and structures in Peterhead
1862 establishments in Scotland
1965 disestablishments in Scotland